St. Mary High School is a private, Roman Catholic high school in Dell Rapids, South Dakota.  It is located in the Roman Catholic Diocese of Sioux Falls.  School colors for St. Mary High School are Red and White.  The school's mascot is the Cardinal.

External links
 School Website

Notes and references

Catholic secondary schools in South Dakota
Schools in Minnehaha County, South Dakota
Roman Catholic Diocese of Sioux Falls